The 1981 German Grand Prix was a Formula One motor race held at the Hockenheimring on 2 August 1981. It was the tenth race of the 1981 Formula One World Championship.

The 45-lap race was won by Brazilian driver Nelson Piquet, driving a Brabham-Ford. Frenchman Alain Prost finished second in a Renault, having started from pole position, with compatriot Jacques Laffite third in a Ligier-Matra. The win, Piquet's third of the season, allowed him to move to within eight points of Drivers' Championship leader, Argentine Carlos Reutemann, who retired with an engine failure.

Qualifying report
The pit entrance had been modified and slowed down; the drivers now entered the pits earlier than before. The two Renault turbo cars were on the front row with Alain Prost almost half a second quicker than teammate René Arnoux. It was the first pole position of Prost's F1 career. Williams locked out the second row with World Championship leader Carlos Reutemann third and teammate Alan Jones fourth. Didier Pironi was fifth in his Ferrari and Nelson Piquet was sixth in his Brabham. The top 10 was completed by Jacques Laffite (Ligier), Gilles Villeneuve (Ferrari) and the two McLarens of John Watson and Andrea de Cesaris.

Qualifying classification

Race report
The two Williams on the second row enjoyed a better start than the Renaults of Prost and Arnoux. Arnoux was overtaken both by Reutemann and Pironi before the first corner, and by Piquet tried a move in the Ostkurve but the two cars collided, deflating Arnoux's right rear tire and causing him to pit at the end of the lap. Piquet lost a place to Jones in the process, whilst Arnoux dropped through the field. On the second lap, Pironi's engine failed, making him retire from fourth. Consequently, Prost led from Reutemann, Jones, Piquet and Laffite, and the top five pulled away from the rest of the pack, led by Villeneuve in sixth. Reutemann was quickly overtaken by both Jones and Piquet, beginning a three-way fight from the lead until Piquet's tires fell off the pace and he dropped to fourth behind Reutemann.

On lap 21, the lead changed when Prost was overtaken by Jones as the duo were lapping Arnoux. Reutemann retired from the race on lap 28 with an engine failure. After around 30 laps, rain started to fall on the circuit and the Renaults suffered from poor handling and third place Piquet quickly overtook Prost for second. Jones' lead was diminished when his engine began to misfire, eventually dropping behind Piquet and Prost before heading to the pits, and he eventually finished a lap behind.

Piquet held on to his lead and finished first, in front of Prost, Laffite and Héctor Rebaque. Eddie Cheever finished fifth to round up the top five, in front of John Watson in sixth.

Race classification

Championship standings after the race

Drivers' Championship standings

Constructors' Championship standings

References

German Grand Prix
German Grand Prix
German Grand Prix